Benjamin Thomas Strutton (1892 – 9 February 1968) was an English cricketer.  Strutton's batting style is unknown, though it is known he bowled slow left-arm orthodox.  He was born at Stifford, Essex.

Strutton made his first-class debut for Essex against Middlesex at the County Ground, Leyton, in the 1914 County Championship.  He made three further first-class appearances for Essex following World War I.  These came in the 1919 County Championship against Yorkshire, Somerset and Hampshire.  In his four first-class matches, he scored a total of 64 runs at an average of 12.80, with a high score of 19.  With the ball, he bowled a total of 49 overs, but despite bowling such a large number of overs he went wicketless.

He died at Southwark, London, on 9 February 1968.

References

External links
Benjamin Strutton at ESPNcricinfo
Benjamin Strutton at CricketArchive

1892 births
1968 deaths
English cricketers
Essex cricketers
People from Stifford